Phlaeoba is a genus of grasshoppers in the family Acrididae and subfamily Acridinae. The recorded distribution of species includes: India, China, Indo-China and Malesia.

Species
The Catalogue of Life lists:
Phlaeoba abbreviata Willemse, 1931
Phlaeoba aberrans Willemse, 1937
Phlaeoba albonema Zheng, 1981
Phlaeoba angustidorsis Bolívar, 1902
Phlaeoba antennata Brunner von Wattenwyl, 1893
Phlaeoba assama Ramme, 1941
Phlaeoba brachyptera Caudell, 1921
Phlaeoba fumida Walker, 1870
Phlaeoba fumosa Serville, 1838 - type species (as Gomphocerus rusticus Stål)
Phlaeoba galeata Walker, 1870
Phlaeoba horvathi Kuthy, 1911
Phlaeoba infumata Brunner von Wattenwyl, 1893
Phlaeoba jiuwanshanensis Zheng & Deng, 2006
Phlaeoba matsumurai Bolívar, 1914
Phlaeoba medogensis Liu, 1981
Phlaeoba nantouensis Ye & Yin, 2007
Phlaeoba panteli Bolívar, 1902
Phlaeoba ramakrishnai Bolívar, 1914
Phlaeoba rotundata Uvarov, 1929
Phlaeoba sikkimensis Ramme, 1941
Phlaeoba sinensis Bolívar, 1914
Phlaeoba tenebrosa Walker, 1871
Phlaeoba unicolor Bolívar, 1914

References

External links
 

Acrididae genera
Orthoptera of Asia
Orthoptera of Indo-China